Ladislav Hrubý (born 22 November 1934) is a Czech cross-country skier. He competed in the men's 15 kilometre event at the 1964 Winter Olympics.

References

External links
 

1934 births
Living people
Czech male cross-country skiers
Olympic cross-country skiers of Czechoslovakia
Cross-country skiers at the 1964 Winter Olympics
People from Semily District
Sportspeople from the Liberec Region